Devon Chesterton "Speedy" Williams (born 8 April 1992) is a Jamaican professional footballer who currently plays as a midfielder for USL Championship club Colorado Springs Switchbacks and the Jamaica national team.

Career

Youth and college
Born in Kingston, Jamaica, Williams began his career in the youth ranks of St. George's College. While with St.George's Williams led the school to two youth championships in 2008 and 2009. In 2010, he joined Real Mona F.C. and remained at the club through 2014. In 2011 Williams accepted an offer to play  college soccer for Robert Morris Colonials. Williams was handed the number 10 shirt and in his four years with the Colonials he appeared in 71 matches scoring 6 goals and recording 15 assists. During the 2014 season Williams also played with Pittsburgh Riverhounds U23.

Professional career

New York Red Bulls
After a lengthy trial with the club, Williams signed with New York Red Bulls II on 8 July 2015. He made his debut for the club on 18 July 2015, appearing as a starter in a 2–0 victory over Harrisburg City Islanders. The following week Williams recorded his first assist for New York, helping Red Bull II to a 4–3 victory over Richmond Kickers. On 12 August 2015, Williams recorded  his second assist of the season when he spotted Stefano Bonomo with a perfect cross into the box which was headed in helping NYRB II to a 1–1 draw against Charlotte Independence. On 22 August 2015, Williams scored his first goal as a professional, helping New York to a 2–0 victory over Toronto FC II.

On 6 July 2016, he made his New York Red Bulls debut in a mid-season friendly against Mexican powerhouse Club America. The Red Bulls went on to win the match by a 2–0 score. On 12 August 2016 Williams scored his first goal of the season for New York in a 5–1 victory over Orlando City B.

Louisville City FC
On December 26, 2021, Louisville City FC announced that they had signed Williams for the 2017 season. Williams made his debut for Louisville on March 25, 2017, in a 0–0 draw versus Saint Louis FC. Williams scored his first goal for Louisville on September 10, 2017, during a 3–0 victory over Pittsburgh Riverhounds FC.

Miami FC
On January 8, 2021, Williams was signed by USL Championship side Miami FC ahead of the 2021 season. Williams made his debut for his new team on May 2, 2021, during a 2–1 victory over Loudoun United FC. He scored his first goal for Miami on May 15, the only goal in a victory over his former club, New York Red Bulls II. On August 17, 2021, Williams was named USL Championship Player of the Week for week 17 of the 2021 season in recognition of his brace scored against Pittsburgh in a 3–2 victory for Miami.

Colorado Springs Switchbacks
On 22 December 2022, it was announced that Williams would join USL Championship side Colorado Springs Switchbacks for the 2023 season.

International career
Williams has represented Jamaica at the U-20 national team level, making five appearances for his country. On 11 August 2010, he made his first international appearance with the senior national team, appearing in a 3–1 victory over Trinidad and Tobago.

Career statistics

International

International goals
Scores and results list Jamaica's goal tally first.

Honors

Club
New York Red Bulls II
USL Cup (1): 2016

Louisville City FC
USL Cup (2): 2017, 2018

Individual
USL Championship All League First Team: 2020

References

External links 
  Speedy Williams rmucolonials.com player profile 
 
 

1992 births
Living people
Jamaican footballers
Jamaican expatriate footballers
Jamaica international footballers
Robert Morris Colonials men's soccer players
Pittsburgh Riverhounds U23 players
New York Red Bulls II players
Louisville City FC players
Miami FC players
Colorado Springs Switchbacks FC players
Association football midfielders
Expatriate soccer players in the United States
Jamaican expatriate sportspeople in the United States
USL League Two players
USL Championship players
Sportspeople from Kingston, Jamaica
2019 CONCACAF Gold Cup players
2021 CONCACAF Gold Cup players
Jamaica under-20 international footballers